"Dangerous" is the first single from French singer M. Pokora's third album MP3. The song was produced by Timbaland and features Timbaland and his younger brother, Sebastian.

Presented in preview during the ceremony of the 2008 NRJ Music Awards, the single was released on 22 March 2008, two days before the release of the album. It went straight to number one in France in the first week, selling 5,674 units that week, but achieved a moderate success in other countries in which it was released. However, it was a top three hit in Belgium (Wallonia), reaching number two in its seventh week.

M. Pokora started to receive attention in North American countries like Mexico, where the video for "Dangerous" was in heavy rotation on MTVLA North and MTVLA Center.

Track listings
 CD single
 "Dangerous" (featuring Timbaland and Sebastian) — 4:44
 "Don't Give My Love Away" (featuring Ryan Leslie) — 3:36

 Digital download
 "Dangerous" (featuring Timbaland and Sebastian) — 4:44

Charts

Peak positions

Year-end charts

References

2008 singles
2008 songs
M. Pokora songs
Timbaland songs
Capitol Records singles
SNEP Top Singles number-one singles
Song recordings produced by Timbaland
Songs written by Jim Beanz
Songs written by Timbaland
Songs written by M. Pokora